Indian Lake is located in Grand Teton National Park, in the U. S. state of Wyoming. Situated on a shelf above Granite Canyon, Indian Lake is flanked to the west by a high ridge exceeding  dotted with unnamed peaks. Indian Lake can be reached from the Open Canyon Trail but requires off trail navigation to access.

References

Lakes of Grand Teton National Park